Mike Ditka Ultimate Football is a 1991 video game published by Accolade.

Gameplay
Mike Ditka Ultimate Football is a game in which the player can choose from all the available 28 professional teams, and can play one game at a time, or play through the full season, or just the playoffs.

Reception

Wallace Poulter reviewed the game for Computer Gaming World, and stated that "Mike Ditka Ultimate Football is a "Smash Mouth" entrant into the field. Its blend of quality graphics, playability and fun combines to form a superior product."

Clayton Walnum for Compute! praised the graphics, animation, sounds, and gameplay, proclaiming "Mike Ditka Ultimate Football scores a touchdown".

Patrick McCarthy for Zero complimented the replay facility and concluded that "It's right up there with Joe Montana - maybe even a bit better."

Reviews
ASM (Aktueller Software Markt) - Jan, 1992
ASM (Aktueller Software Markt) - Feb, 1992
Mean Machines - Oct, 1991
Electronic Gaming Monthly - Dec, 1991
Consolemania (Italian)

References

1991 video games
American football video games
DOS games
Sega Genesis games
Video games based on real people
Video games developed in the United States